Trosia nigropunctigera, commonly known as the rosy ermine moth, is a lepidopteran in the family Megalopygidae native to the Neotropics. These moths are distributed across Costa Rica, Panama, Colombia, Venezuela, Guyana, Ecuador and Peru. The species was first described by David Stephen Fletcher in 1982.

Description
The thorax of Trosia nigropunctigera is densely clad with short hairs and is white or straw-coloured with six distinct red spots. The forewings are white or pale straw colour with a single row of black spots running across parallel with the rear margin. The head, abdomen, legs, and forewings are pink or red.

Distribution and habitat
Trosia nigropunctigera is native to the rainforests and cloudforests of  Costa Rica, Panama, Colombia, Venezuela, Guyana, Ecuador and Peru.

References

Moths described in 1982
Megalopygidae
Moths of Central America
Moths of South America
Lepidoptera of Colombia
Lepidoptera of Peru
Lepidoptera of Venezuela
Fauna of Costa Rica
Fauna of Panama
Lepidoptera of Guyana
Lepidoptera of Ecuador